Conant Meigs King (December 10, 1880 – February 19, 1958), known as Charles King or Con King, was an American athlete who competed mainly in the jumps.

He competed for the United States in the 1904 Summer Olympics held in St Louis, United States. He won silver medals in the standing long jump and the standing triple jump; on both occasions, he was beaten by his teammate Ray Ewry.

References

External links
 
 
 

1880 births
1958 deaths
American male long jumpers
American male triple jumpers
Olympic silver medalists for the United States in track and field
Athletes (track and field) at the 1904 Summer Olympics
Medalists at the 1904 Summer Olympics